Luis Batres Juarros or Luis Batres y Juarros (New Guatemala de la Asunción 7 May 1802 – 17 June 1862) was an influential conservative Guatemalan politician during the regime of General Rafael Carrera. Member of the Aycinena clan, was in charge of writing most of the legislation that was enacted during this period. The liberal historians portray him as a villain in a despotic and tyrannical government headed by illiterate Raca Carraca - Rafael Carrera - who was taking each and every one of Batres recommendations since he was considered infallible; However, research conducted between 1980 and 2010 has shown a more objective biography of both Batres and Rafael Carrera and show that it was in fact Carrera who had the reins of the Conservative government.

Biography 

Batres Juarros was the son of José María González de Batres y Muñoz and María de las Mercedes Juarros Lacunza. He attended the Pontifical University of San Carlos Borromeo from which he graduated in 1823. He participated in the war against Francisco Morazán and his liberal forces under the command of the Governor of Guatemala, Mariano de Aycinena y Piñol with whom he was related. After Aycinena's defeat, he was banished by Morazan with another one hundred families belonging to the Aycinena clan, going into exile to Panama and then to the United States. He returned to Guatemala in 1839 when rebel general Rafael Carrera began to assert his authority in the state and managed to become one of his top aides and government ministers  He even got his wife, Adelaida García Granados, to become a confidant and mentor to Carrera's wife, Petrona Alvarez

State of Los Altos 

After the violent and bloody reinstatement of the State of Los Altos by Carrera in April 1840, Batres Juarros -then secretary general of the Guatemalan government of recently reinstated Mariano Rivera Paz- obtained from the vicar Larrazabal authorization to dismantle the regionalist Church.  Acting priests of Quetzaltenango -capital of the would-be-state of Los Altos, priest Urban Ugarte and his coadjutor, priest José Maria Aguilar, were removed from their parish and likewise the priests of the parishes of San Martin Jilotepeque and San Lucas Tolimán. Larrazabal ordered the priests Fernando Antonio Dávila, Mariano Navarrete and Jose Ignacio Iturrioz to cover the parishes of Quetzaltenango, San Martin Jilotepeque and San Lucas Toliman, respectively.

References

Bibliography

Notes 

1802 births
1862 deaths
Rafael Carrera
People from Guatemala City
Conservatism in Guatemala
Guatemalan people of Spanish descent
Mayors of Guatemala City
Universidad de San Carlos de Guatemala alumni
19th-century Guatemalan people
Guatemalan politicians
Members of the Aycinena family in Central America